Blockhead is the name of a theoretical computer system invented as part of a thought experiment by philosopher Ned Block, which appeared in a paper titled "Psychologism and Behaviorism". Block did not name the computer in the paper.

Overview
In "Psychologism and Behaviorism," Block argues that the internal mechanism of a system is important in determining whether that system is intelligent and claims to show that a non-intelligent system could pass the Turing test.

Block asks us to imagine a conversation lasting any given amount of time. He states that given the nature of language, there are a finite number of syntactically- and grammatically-correct sentences that can be used to start a conversation. Consequently, there is a limit to how many "sensible" responses can be made to the first sentence, then to the second sentence, and so on until the conversation ends.

Block then asks the reader to imagine a computer which had been programmed with all the sentences in theory, if not in practice. Block argues that such a machine could continue a conversation with a person on any topic because the computer would be programmed with every sentence that it was possible to use so the computer would be able to pass the Turing test despite the fact that — according to Block — it was not intelligent.

Block says that this does not show that there is only one correct internal structure for generating intelligence but simply that some internal structures do not generate intelligence.

The argument is related to John Searle's Chinese room.

A recent objection to the Blockhead argument is Hanoch Ben-Yami (2005), who agrees that Block's machine lacks intelligence but compares its answers to a poetic dialogue in which one man is whispered romantic poetry to recite to his would-be lover as it answers only what it has been told to answer in advance by its programmers.

Sources
 .
 .
 

Theory of computation
Philosophy of artificial intelligence
Thought experiments in philosophy of mind

See also 
 Dissociated press
 Philosophical zombie